Mariyan Ivanov (born 10 July 1990) is a Bulgarian footballer who plays as a defender for Etar Veliko Tarnovo.

References

External links

1990 births
Living people
Bulgarian footballers
FC Etar 1924 Veliko Tarnovo players
PFC Kaliakra Kavarna players
SFC Etar Veliko Tarnovo players
FC Lokomotiv Gorna Oryahovitsa players
FC Botev Vratsa players
FC Septemvri Sofia players
First Professional Football League (Bulgaria) players
Association football defenders
People from Veliko Tarnovo
Sportspeople from Veliko Tarnovo Province